The mrigal carp (Cirrhinus cirrhosus), also known as the white carp, is a species of ray-finned fish in the carp family. Native to streams and rivers in India, the only surviving wild population is in the Cauvery River, leading to its IUCN rating as vulnerable. It is widely aquafarmed and introduced populations exist outside its native range. This species and Cirrhinus mrigala are considered distinct.

Aquaculture
Mrigal is popular as a food fish and an important aquacultured freshwater species throughout South Asia.  It is widely farmed as a component of a polyculture system of three Indian major carps, along with roho labeo and the catla. The introduced by aquaculture across India started in the early 1940s and in the 1950s and in the 1960s to other Asian countries. The mrigal carp fails to breed naturally in ponds, thus induced breeding is done.

The Indian carps are considered as a delicacy compared to other exotic carp species also cultured in Asia, and sell for higher prices. Reported annual aquafarming production numbers of mrigal carp since the early 1990s have varied between 250,000 and 550,000 tonnes, with no clear trend. India and Bangladesh are the largest producers.
In Pakistan, this fish is known by the name of "Morakhi" or "Moree".

The Mrigal carp was brought to Guangdong province in southern China for aquaculture, but it is now considered an invasive species in the Pearl River basin.

Habitat and ecology
Mrigal is the benthopelagic and potamodromous plankton feeder. It inhabits fast flowing streams and rivers, but can tolerate high levels of salinity. A  female can lay a million eggs.

References

mrigal carp
Fish farming
Commercial fish
Fish of India
Fish of Bangladesh
Marine fauna of South Asia
mrigal carp
mrigal carp